Ragnhildur Jón­asdóttir, also known as Ragga Holm, is an Icelandic rapper, radio host and DJ. She is a member of the band Reykjavíkurdætur.

Discography 
BIPOLAR (2018)

References

Living people
Ragga Holm
Ragga Holm
Ragga Holm
Year of birth missing (living people)